Crypto.com is a cryptocurrency exchange company based in Singapore. As of May 2022, the company reportedly had 50 million customers and 4,000 employees. The exchange issues a token, Cronos.

History

The company was initially founded in Hong Kong by Bobby Bao, Gary Or, Kris Marszalek, and Rafael Melo in 2016 as "Monaco". In 2018, the company was renamed as Crypto.com following a purchase of a domain owned by cryptography researcher and professor Matt Blaze. Domain sellers valued the domain at US$5–10 million.

Crypto.com is operated by Foris DAX Asia, a Singapore-based company that's a subsidiary of Foris DAX MT (Malta) Limited.

The company which had 10 million users in February 2021, reported more than 50 million active users as of May 2022.

In January 2022, Crypto.com was the victim of a hack totaling US$15 million in stolen Ether. After some users reported suspicious activity on their accounts, the company paused withdrawals. Withdrawal services were later restored alongside a statement from the company that no customer funds were lost.

On August 18, 2022, it was reported that Crypto.com had been quietly letting go of hundreds of employees, beyond its initial 5% layoff in June, due to the downturn in the cryptocurrency market.

By October 10, 2022, it was reported that Crypto.com had laid off over 2,000 employees (reportedly 30% to 40% of their staff) since May, due to the cryptocurrency market downturn.

In November 2022, the exchange's token, Cronos, lost approximately $1 billion in value. The decline was caused in part due to concerns after the collapse of FTX, whose executive team was revealed to have used its native token, FTT, to prop up the balance sheet of a sister company and to have allegedly engaged in other fraudulent behaviors. On 14 November, Marszalek, the firm's CEO, assured users that the exchange was functioning as normal.

Products 

Crypto.com services include an app, exchange, wallet and NFT marketplace.

In May 2022, they partnered with Shopify to allow businesses which use the e-commerce platform to accept payments in cryptocurrency.

Promotional activities 

Crypto.com signed actor Matt Damon to serve as Crypto.com's brand ambassador in October 2021.

In September 2021, the company became Paris Saint-Germain F.C. official cryptocurrency platform. The partnership included the release of exclusive Non-Fungible Tokens on Crypto.com's NFT platform.

In September 2021, Philadelphia 76ers announced Crypto.com as official jersey patch partner.

In November 2021, the company acquired the naming rights to Los Angeles's Staples Center, renaming it Crypto.com Arena in a 20-year deal reported to be valued at US$700 million.

In early 2022, the company announced a partnership with the LeBron James Family Foundation to provide educational resources focused on blockchain-related topics to students of the I Promise School in Akron, Ohio. It signed a sponsor deal for the 2022 FIFA World Cup.

Regulations

Asia
The Monetary Authority of Singapore announced that it had given in-principle approval to the company for a Major Payment Institution License, allowing it to provide digital payment token services in the country. In August 2022, Crypto.com acquired two South Korean startups - the payment service provider PnLink Co., Ltd and the virtual asset service provider OK-BIT Co., Ltd. With these acquisitions, the company secured registration licenses to provide financial services under South Korea's electronic financial transaction act and as a virtual asset service provider.

Europe
The company received approval from the United Kingdom's Financial Conduct Authority to be registered as a crypto asset service provider in August 2022. Crypto.com has received an electronic money institution (EMI) license in Malta. And, the Malta Financial Services Authority granted it an electronic money institution license and a Class 3 Virtual Financial Assets License. It received regulatory approval to operate in Cyprus from the Cyprus Securities and Exchange Commission. In September 2022, Crypto.com received the approval of the French authorities, and a month later announced plans to establish a European headquarters in Paris and invest 150 million euros in the French division.

See also 

 Binance
 Kraken
 Coinbase
 BTCC (company)

References

Cryptocurrencies
Online companies of Singapore
Internet properties established in 2016
Technology companies established in 2016
2016 establishments in Singapore
Bitcoin exchanges
Digital currency exchanges